Nerone fatto Cesare is a lost dramma per musica  by Antonio Vivaldi.

Performance history
The opera was first performed at the Teatro Sant'Angelo in Venice during Carnival in 1715. It was revived (with many new arias) for the Accademia, Brescia, at the 1716 Carnival.

Roles

References

 

Opera seria
1715 operas
Operas by Antonio Vivaldi
Italian-language operas
Operas
Lost operas